O. maculata may refer to:

 Oaracta maculata, a geometer moth
 Ocyropsis maculata, a comb jelly
 Odontocheilopteryx maculata, a snout moth
 Oeceoclades maculata, a monk orchid
 Oecia maculata, a long-horned moth
 Oedipoda maculata, a band-winged grasshopper
 Oligoria maculata, an American skipper
 Oliva maculata, a sea snail
 Onchidella maculata, a sea slug
 Ophryotrocha maculata, a ringed worm
 Orchis maculata, a perennial plant
 Orleanesia maculata, a plant native to South America
 Oxycera maculata, a soldier fly
 Oxychona maculata, a land snail
 Oxymeris maculata, an auger snail